XHJC-FM is a radio station in Mexicali, Baja California. Broadcasting on 91.5 FM, XHJC carries the Exa FM national format from MVS Radio.

History
The station's concession was awarded in 1980 to José de Jesús Cortés y Barbosa.

The station was sold by Sociedad Mexicana de Radio de Baja California to MVS Radio and its concession transferred in 2012.

References

Radio stations in Mexicali
MVS Radio